The 1964 New Zealand Grand Prix was a race held at Pukekohe Park Raceway on 11 January 1964.  The race had 16 starters.

It was the eleventh New Zealand Grand Prix and doubled as round two of the 1964 Tasman Series.  Bruce McLaren broke through to finally win his home grand prix in this the first official Tasman Series. This win paved the way for McLaren's overall victory in the first Tasman Series.

Classification 
Results as follows:

Notes 
Pole position: Jack Brabham
Fastest lap: Frank Matich – 1'26.2

References

New Zealand Grand Prix
Grand Prix
Tasman Series
January 1964 sports events in New Zealand